The Commission on Presidential Debates (CPD) is a nonprofit corporation established in 1987 under the joint sponsorship of the Democratic and Republican political parties in the United States. The CPD sponsors and produces debates for U.S. presidential and vice-presidential candidates and undertakes research and educational activities relating to the debates. It has run all of the presidential debates held since 1988. The commission's debates are sponsored by private contributions from foundations and corporations as well as fees from hosting institutions.

The commission's exclusion of third-party candidates from the debates has been the subject of controversy and legal challenges.

History

Debates before the CPD 
The first televised presidential debates were held between Richard Nixon and John F. Kennedy during the 1960 campaign. No general-election debates were done in 1964, and Richard Nixon refused to participate in any debate in 1968 and 1972. Beginning with the 1976 election, the League of Women Voters sponsored the televised Gerald Ford–Jimmy Carter debates, followed by the John B. Anderson–Ronald Reagan and Reagan–Carter debates for the 1980 election, and Reagan and Walter Mondale in 1984.

Formation 
After studying the election process in 1985, the bipartisan National Commission on Elections recommended "[t]urning over the sponsorship of presidential debates to the two major parties". The CPD was established in 1987 by the chairmen of the Democratic and Republican Parties to "take control of the presidential debates". The commission was staffed by members from the two parties and chaired by the heads of the Democratic and Republican parties, Paul G. Kirk and Frank Fahrenkopf. At a 1987 press conference announcing the commission's creation, Fahrenkopf said that the commission was not likely to include third-party candidates in debates, and Kirk said he personally believed they should be excluded from the debates.

In 1988, the League of Women Voters withdrew its sponsorship of the presidential debates after the George H. W. Bush and Michael Dukakis campaigns secretly agreed to a "memorandum of understanding" that would decide which candidates could participate in the debates, which individuals would be panelists (and therefore able to ask questions), and the height of the lecterns. The league rejected the demands and released a statement saying that it was withdrawing support for the debates because "the demands of the two campaign organizations would perpetrate a fraud on the American voter."

The CPD has sponsored the debates in 1988, 1992, 1996, 2000, 2004, 2008, 2012, 2016, and 2020.

Washington University in St. Louis has been selected by the commission to host more presidential and vice-presidential debates than any institution in history.

In January 2022 the Republican National Committee warned the CPD that it planned to amend the Rules of the Republican Party to prohibit Republican presidential nominees from attending CPD-sponsored debates. The amendment was unanimously passed on April 14.

Leadership 
The commission is headed by Frank Fahrenkopf, a former Republican National Committee chairman, Dorothy S. Ridings, the president and chief executive officer of the Council on Foundations, and Kenneth Wollack, former president of the National Democratic Institute. As of 2020, the board of directors consisted of John C. Danforth, Charles Gibson, John Griffen, Yvonne Hao, Jane Harman, Antonia Hernandez, Reverend John I. Jenkins, Newton N. Minow, Richard D. Parsons, and Olympia Snowe. Janet H. Brown is the current executive director.

Criticism 

In 2000 the CPD established a rule that candidates must garner at least 15% support across five national polls to be included in the national debates. This rule has been controversial as it has effectively excluded U.S. parties other than the two major parties.

On October 8, 2004, two presidential candidates, Libertarian candidate Michael Badnarik and Green Party candidate David Cobb, were arrested while protesting against CPD for excluding third-party candidates from the nationally televised debates in St. Louis, Missouri. On October 16, 2012, Green Party presidential nominee Jill Stein and vice-presidential nominee Cheri Honkala were arrested for disorderly conduct while trying to take part in the second presidential debate at Hofstra University in Hempstead, New York.

The 2020 United States presidential debates were controversial and received complaints from both Republicans and Democrats. Democrats criticized the commission following the first debate, feeling they were too lenient on President Donald Trump and felt not enough was done to prevent interruptions from the candidate by moderator Chris Wallace. Conversely, Republicans criticized the commission's choice of Steve Scully to moderate the second debate, after he accidentally leaked an exchange between himself and former White House Communications Director Anthony Scaramucci, asking him how he should respond to criticism issued by the president. Scully claimed his Twitter account, which the exchange was leaked onto, was hacked, but he later admitted to lying about this. In response to complaints concerning interruptions, President Trump and former Vice President Joe Biden had their microphones muted after each would deliver their responses for the third debate, and the second debate that was to be hosted by Scully was cancelled for unrelated reasons, though Scully was suspended by C-SPAN for having lied about his dialogue with Scaramucci.

Multiple lawsuits have been filed by third-party candidates challenging the CPD's policy of requiring a candidate to have 15% support in national polls to be included in presidential debates. The lawsuits have challenged the requirement on a number of grounds, including claims that it violates Federal Election Commission (FEC) rules and that it violates antitrust laws; none of the lawsuits have been successful.

References

External links 

Full text of CPD's contract for the Bush/Kerry debates of 2004 (PDF)
Fair Debates Project
Open Debates 
Free And Equal Elections Foundation

United States presidential debates
1987 establishments in the United States
Organizations established in 1987